White Patch is a coastal town and locality of Bribie Island in the Moreton Bay Region, Queensland, Australia. In the  the locality of White Patch had a population of 142 people.

Geography
White Patch is on the western side of Bribie Island, adjacent to the Pumicestone Channel which forms its western boundary. Wright Creek passes through the southern part of the locality into Pumicestone Channel. The land along the western coast has residential development. The remaining land is undeveloped land, with two areas ( and ) being within the Bribie Island National Park.

History

The town was originally called Bribie, but was renamed White Patch on 1 September 1980. The name White Patch refers a sand patch formerly visible from Pumicestone Channel.

In 1799 Matthew Flinders beached his sloop Norfolk for repairs at White Patch.

The Queensland Government sold 140 town lots in the Town of Bribie at the "White Patch" in 1887.

A Department of Public Lands cadastral map drawn up in June 1925 shows properties facing Pumicestone Channel, bordered by Maud street on the north west, Charles Street to the north and Bunbuba Street on the south east.

In November 1948, fishermen at White Patch claimed to have seen a sea serpent. It was said to hiss and squeak. In December 1948, Eric Decker, the Member of the Queensland Legislative Assembly for Sandgate, caught such a "serpent" while on holidays at Bribie Island. Mr Mack, curator at the Queensland Museum, said the description was consistent with a common sea snake  in Moreton Bay.

The median age of the White Patch population was 53 years, 16 years above the national median of 37. 68.4% of people living in White Patch were born in Australia. The other top responses for country of birth were England 14%, New Zealand 4.4%, Germany 3.5%, Netherlands 3.5%, Sweden 2.6%. 92.2% of people spoke only English at home; the next most common languages were 2.6% French, 2.6% Swedish.

Education 
There are no schools in White Patch. The nearest government primary school is Banksia Beach State School in neighbouring Banksia Beach to the south-east. The nearest government secondary school is Bribie Island State High School in Bongaree to the south-east.

Attractions
A talking monument tells the story of the landing of Matthew Flinders on Bribie Island in July 1799.

References

External links 

 

Suburbs of Moreton Bay Region
Towns in Queensland
Localities in Queensland
Bribie Island